This is a list of notable Székelys (a Hungarian subgroup living mostly in the Székely Land in Romania, estimated to number about 500,000–700,000 as of 2022) and of people of Székely descent, sorted by field and name:

Athletes

Francisc Balla (born 1932), freestyle wrestler, won silver medals at the 1965 and 1967 World Wrestling Championships and a silver medal (1967) and bronze medal (1968) at the European Wrestling Championships
Mihály Bodosi (1909 – 2005), athlete, competed in the men's high jump at the 1936 Summer Olympics
László Bölöni (born 1953), Romanian football player and manager of Hungarian ethnicity
Zsolt Erőss (1968 – 2013), mountain climber
Réka Forika (born 1989), Romanian biathlete of Hungarian ethnicity, won a gold medal at the Biathlon Junior World Championships 2010
Csaba Györffy (1943 – 2018), Romanian international footballer
Mónika György (born 1982), Romanian cross-country skier of Hungarian ethnicity
Kálmán Hazai (1913 – 1996), water polo player, won a gold medal at the 1936 Summer Olympics
Ferenc Ilyés (born 1981), Hungarian international handball player
Emil Imre (born 1996), Romanian short track speed skater of Hungarian ethnicity, won a gold medal at the 2013 European Youth Olympic Winter Festival
Kriszta Incze (born 1996), freestyle wrestler, won a silver medal at the 2019 European Championships, a bronze medal at the 2021 European Championships, a bronze medal at the 2022 European Championships, and another bronze medal at the 2019 European Games
Zoltán Kádár (born 1966), Romanian international football player of Hungarian ethnicity
Zoltán Kelemen (born 1986), Romanian figure skater
Lajos Keresztes (1900 – 1978), wrestler, won a gold medal at the 1928 Summer Olympics and a silver medal at the 1924 Summer Olympics
Katalin Kristó (born 1983), Romanian short track speed skater of Hungarian ethnicity
Csaba László (born 1964), Romanian-Hungarian professional football manager 
Márton Lőrincz (1911 – 1969), wrestler, won a gold medal at the 1936 Summer Olympics
Tímea Lőrincz (born 1992), Romanian cross-country skier of Hungarian ethnicity
Edit Matei (born 1964), Austrian-Romanian international handball player
Edit Miklós (born 1988), Hungarian-Romanian World Cup alpine ski racer of Hungarian ethnicity; she began skiing at age five, participating in World Cup races for children by the age of 12, and making her World Cup debut in December 2005 at age 17
Endre Molnár (born 1945), water polo player, won a gold medal at the 1976 Summer Olympics, as well as a silver medal at the 1972 Summer Olympics, a bronze medal at the 1968 Summer Olympics, and another bronze medal at the 1980 Summer Olympics
Roland Niczuly (born 1995), Romanian professional football player, captain of Sepsi OSK
Carol-Eduard Novak (born 1976), Romanian road and track racing cyclist of Hungarian ethnicity
Tibor Selymes (born 1970), Romanian international football player
Iozefina Ștefănescu (1932 – 2015), Romanian handball player
Ecaterina Szabo (born 1967), artistic gymnast, won 20 Olympic, world and continental medals, including four Olympic golds
Éva Székely (1927 – 2020), swimmer, won a gold medal at the 1952 Summer Olympics and a silver medal at the 1956 Summer Olympics
Bernadette Szőcs (born 1995), Romanian professional table tennis player
Emőke Szőcs (born 1985), Romanian-born biathlonist
Éva Tófalvi (born 1978), Romanian biathlete of Hungarian ethnicity
Maria Török-Duca (born 1959), professional handball player and manager, regarded by some as the greatest Romanian playmaker of all time 
Levente Vajda (born 1981), chess player, Grandmaster
Szidonia Vajda (born 1979), chess player, with FIDE titles of International Master and Woman Grandmaster
Lajos Vákár (1910 – 1993), ice hockey player and coach

Science and Humanities

János Apáczai Csere (1625 – 1659), polyglot, pedagogist, philosopher and theologian
Márton Balázs (1929 – 2016), Romanian mathematician of Hungarian descent
Albert-László Barabási (born 1967), Romanian-born Hungarian-American physicist, known for his discoveries in network science and network medicine
Ákos Birtalan (1962 – 2011), economist and politician
Péter Bod (1712 – 1768), theologian and historian
Farkas Bolyai (1775 – 1856), mathematician
János Bolyai (1802 – 1860), mathematician who developed absolute geometry
László Borbély (born 1954), economist and politician
Edmond Bordeaux Szekely (1905 – 1979), philologist, linguist, psychologist
Sándor Kőrösi Csoma (1784 – 1842), philologist and Orientalist
Endre Fülei-Szántó (1924 – 1995), linguist, author and professor
György Frunda (born 1951), jurist and politician
Erasmus Julius Nyárády (1881 – 1966), botanist
Tivadar Puskás (1844 – 1893), inventor, telephone pioneer, and inventor of the telephone exchange
István Szamosközy (1570 – 1612), humanist and historian
Gyula Vályi (1855 – 1913), mathematician and theoretical physicist
Attila Verestóy (1954 – 2018), chemical engineer and politician

Musicians

Bíborka Bocskor (born 1982), singer and songwriter
Boldizsár Csiky (born 1937), composer
Annamari Dancs (born 1981), singer
János Koós (1937 – 2019), pop singer
Kálmán Mihalik (1896 – 1922), physician and composer, set the music for Székely himnusz 
Imre Palló (1891 – 1978), baritone, opera house manager
Anne Roselle (1894 – 1989), opera singer and actress

Artists

Miklós Barabás (1810 – 1898), painter
Attila Bartis (born 1968), writer, photographer, dramatist and journalist
André de Dienes (1913 – 1985), photographer, noted for his work with Marilyn Monroe
Manyi Kiss (1911 – 1971), theater and film actress
Róza Laborfalvi (1817 – 1886), theater actress, noblewoman
Louis C.K. (born 1967), American comedian of Hungarian origin
Ferenc Márton (1884 – 1940), painter
János Mattis-Teutsch (1884 – 1960), painter, sculptor, graphic artist, art critic and poet, father of Székely origins
Imre Nagy (1893 – 1976), painter
István Nagy (1873 – 1937), artist who specialized in landscapes and figure painting
Bertalan Székely (1835 – 1910), history and portrait painter
Gábor Tompa (born 1957), theater and film director

Writers

Gloria Álvarez (born 1985), radio and television presenter, author, and libertarian political commentator, mother of Székely origin
Olga Bede (1908 – 1925), writer
Elek Benedek (1859 – 1929), journalist and writer
Domokos Bölöni (born 1946), writer and journalist
György Csanády (1895 – 1952), poet, journalist and radio director, the author of Székely himnusz
György Dragomán (born 1973), author and translator
György Enyedi (1555 – 1597), Unitarian bishop, moderator, and writer
Sándor Bölöni Farkas (1795 – 1842), writer
Attila György (born 1971), writer, journalist, literary editor
Sándor Kányádi (1929 – 2018), poet and translator, one of the most famous and beloved Hungarian poets in his lifetime
Kelemen Mikes (1690 – 1761), political figure and essayist
József Nyírő (1889 – 1953), writer of popular short stories and novels
Balázs Orbán (1829 – 1890), author, ethnographic collector, parliamentarian, correspondent member of the Hungarian Academy of Sciences
Erno Polgar (1954 – 2018), writer, nominated for the Nobel Prize in Literature in 2017
Dávid Baróti Szabó (1739 – 1819), poet, linguist, Jesuit priest and teacher
Géza Szőcs (1953 – 2020), poet and politician
Áron Tamási (1897 – 1966), Hungarian writer, famous for his stories written in original Székely style

Military

János Czetz (1822 – 1904), military commander
György Dózsa (1470 – 1514), man-at-arms
Áron Gábor (1814 – 1849), artillery officer
Albert Király (fl. 1595), military leader
Vilmos Nagy de Nagybaczon (1884 – 1976), commanding general of the Royal Hungarian Army, Hungarian Minister of Defense, military theorist and historian
Moses Székely (c. 1553 – 1603), nobleman and military leader

Politicians

József Dudás (1912 – 1957), politician and resistance fighter
Sámuel Kálnoky (1640 – 1706), Chancellor of Transylvania
Attila Kelemen (1948 – 2022), Romanian politician and Member of the European Parliament
Hunor Kelemen (born 1967), politician and writer
Károly Király (1930 – 2021), politician
Elek Köblös (1887 – 1938), activist and political leader
Vasile Luca (1898 – 1963), Austro-Hungarian-born Romanian and Soviet politician of Székely origin 
Béla Markó (born 1951), Romanian politician
Imre Mikó (1805 – 1876), statesman, politician, economist, historian and patron 
Zsolt Nagy (born 1971), Romanian politician of Hungarian ethnicity
László Rajk (1909 – 1949), politician, Hungarian Minister of Interior and Minister of Foreign Affairs
Barna Tánczos (born 1976), politician
Lóránt Vincze (born 1977), politician

Other

Attila Ambrus (born 1967), bank robber
Florence Baker (1841 – 1916), explorer
Zoltán Dani (born 1956), Yugoslav army officer, father of Székely origin
Sándor Demján (1943 – 2018), businessman, entrepreneur, the second richest person in Hungary according to Forbes
Gergely Kovács (born 1968), archbishop of the Archdiocese of Alba Iulia.
Áron Márton (1896 – 1980), Roman Catholic prelate, Bishop of Alba Iulia
Moses Székely the Younger (1603 – c. 1658), nobleman, Prince of Transylvania

See also
List of Hungarians

References

Lists of people by nationality
Székelys